Burgstall is a comune (municipality) in South Tyrol in northern Italy.

Geography
Burgstall is located in the Burggrafenamt. The village center is situated at about 270 m, slightly elevated above the valley floor. To the east, the municipal area rises up to 1000 m on the slopes of the Tschögglberg mountain; to the west, it ends at the Adige river.

Burgstall borders the following municipalities: Gargazon, Lana, Merano, Mölten, and Vöran.

History

Coat-of-arms
The emblem shows a eurasian sparrowhawk, which is to fly up, on argent. It is the arms of the Knights of Burgstall, the emblem was granted in 1966.

Society

Linguistic distribution
According to the 2011 census, 76.61% of the population speak German, 22.78% Italian and 0.61% Ladin as first language.

Demographic evolution

References

External links
 Homepage of the municipality

Municipalities of South Tyrol